Chalky Mount is a community in the parish of Saint Andrew in Barbados.

References

Populated places in Barbados
Saint Andrew, Barbados